Lavinia Jane Kelsey (23 February 1856–16 June 1948) was a New Zealand kindergarten founder and teacher. She was born in London, London, England on 23 February 1856.

References

1856 births
1948 deaths
New Zealand educators
English emigrants to New Zealand
19th-century New Zealand people